Miss France 2010, the 63rd Miss France pageant, was held in Nice, Provence-Alpes-Côte d'Azur on December 5, 2009. Malika Ménard of Normandy was crowned Miss France 2010 by the outgoing titleholder Chloé Mortaud of Albigeois Midi-Pyrénées, who was 5th runner-up at Miss Universe 2009 and 3rd runner-up at Miss World 2009.

For the first time since 1987, Miss France was chosen by viewer voting, after the five finalists had been announced during the live broadcast. Only the judges had selected the five finalists out of the top twelve.

The 37 contestants traveled to Martinique for fashion shoots, videos and interviews, from 13 to 21 November.

Results

Places

Order of announcements
Top 12

1. Rhône Alpes
2. Champagne Ardenne
3. Orléanais
4. Brittany
5. Quercy Rouergue
6. Normandy

7. Mayotte
8. Provence
9. French Guiana
10. Côte d'Azur
11. Limousin
12. Pays de Savoie

Top 5
1. Normandy
2. Provence
3. Quercy Rouergue
4. Rhône Alpes
5. Brittany

Preliminary events

Martinique
The delegates of Miss France 2010 visited the island of the Martinique for their preparation trip. They visited the island but they also did photo shoots and other activities.

Judges
 Arielle Dombasle - Actress
 Jean-Luc Reichmann - Television Personality
 Mareva Galanter - Miss France 1999
 Jean-Paul Gaultier - Designer
  Farida Khelfa- Actress
 Jimmy Jean-Louis - Actor on NBC's Heroes
 Xavier Deluc - Actor

Contestants

Historical significance
Normandy won the Miss France crown after five years drought.
Brittany scored its highest placement since Monique Lemaire won in 1962.
 Regions made into the Top 12 previous year were: Brittany, Limousin, Mayotte, Normandy and Rhône-Alpes.
French Guiana last placed in 2008.
Champagne-Ardenne last placed in 1991.
Pays de Loire was unplaced after four consecutive years of finalists.
Réunion was unplaced after five consecutive years of finalists.
Normandy won its sixth crown, now the second most successful region to compete in the pageant, tied with Paris.
Jean-Pierre Foucault hosted the pageant for the fifteenth time.

Regional pageant notes

Region changes
Languedoc-Roussillon, split into Languedoc and Roussilllon

Returning region
Bearn-Gascogne

Withdrawals
New Caledonia

Crossovers 
Contestants who previously competed or will be competing at international beauty pageants:

Miss Universe
2010:  Normandy - Malika Ménard (Top 15)
 (Las Vegas)
's representative

Miss World
2010:  Rhône Alpes - Virginie Dechenaud (Top 25)
 (Sanya)
's representative

Miss Caraïbes Hibiscus
2010:  French Guiana - Tineffa Naïsso (Winner)
 (St Martin)
's representative

External links
  Miss France official website

Miss France
2009 beauty pageants
2009 in France
Nice